Daniel Clark may refer to:

 Daniel Clark (actor) (born 1985), American actor
 Daniel Clark (basketball) (born 1988), British basketball player
 Daniel Clark (Connecticut colonial leader) (1622–1710)
 Daniel Clark (New Hampshire politician) (1809–1891), U.S. senator
 Daniel Clark (Louisiana politician) (c. 1766–1813), first Delegate from Orleans Territory to the United States House of Representatives
 Daniel F. Clark (1954–2014), Pennsylvania politician
 Daniel Kinnear Clark (1822–1896), British railway engineer
 Daniel B. Clark (1890–1961), American cinematographer
 Daniel Clark, shoemaker (d.1744) murder victim in Britain, victim of Eugene Aram

See also
Dan Clark (disambiguation)
Danny Clark (disambiguation)
Dan Clarke (born 1983), British autoracer